Pintadito is a southern suburb of the capital city Artigas of Artigas Department in northern Uruguay.

Geography

The stream Arroyo Pintadito, a tributary of Río Cuareim, flows east of the suburb.

Population
In 2011, Pintadito had a population of 1,642 inhabitants.
 
Source: Instituto Nacional de Estadística de Uruguay

References

External links
INE map of Artigas, Pintadito, Cerro Ejido, Cerro Signorelli and Cerro San Eugenio

Populated places in the Artigas Department